Hà Nội Highway or Hanoi Highway, formerly called Bien Hoa Highway, is the road linking Ho Chi Minh City and Biên Hòa.

History 
The Hanoi Highway, formerly known as Bien Hoa Highway, was constructed between July 1957 and April 1961. The road was funded by American economic aid as a part of a massive nation building effort conducted over the course of the Vietnam War. The highway originally was nearly 32 kilometers long and 21 meters wide, spanning between the 4 Hang Xanh intersection and the intersection of Highway 1A 3 Gorges. At the moment of its inauguration by President Ngo Dinh Diem, the highway had two major bridges, six intermediate bridges, drainage systems, and erosion and traffic controls. The highway was surfaced with asphalt, a relatively modern innovation.  

Though the highway was constructed under the pretenses of economic development, the use of this cutting-edge technology bred suspicion that the highway had been built with the intent of military use. However, many countered that the presence of the highway would encourage local residents to build communities and open businesses along the roadside, a narrative that the United States happily adopted. All in all, paid for under the pretenses of non-military economic development, the road cost more than that which was spent on "labor, community development, social welfare, health, housing, and education combined for the period 1954-1961."

In 1971, improvements were made to accommodate for civilian use. The route was designed to prevent two-way travel. Each dimension had two aisles, and this highway had two major bridges: the Saigon Bridge (982 m long) across the Saigon River and Dong Nai bridge (453 m long) across the Dong Nai River. [1]

In 1984 the highway was renamed Hanoi Highway on the 30th anniversary of the liberation of Hanoi. Another name of this route is National Highway 52, commonly used to refer to the period from Saigon bridge to the intersection with Highway 1A in Thu Duc junction (junction of Station 2). Currently on Hanoi Highway 1A, it includes a highway crossing, starting from junction to junction Thu Duc, Ho Nai aka fork for Sat Sat Bien Hoa city is located near the junction, the intersection three Park April 30, (intersection with Highway 1K, beyond the intersection of the Three Gorges).

Areas that the Hanoi highway passes through include Bình Thạnh District (wards 2 and 9), Thu Duc of Ho Chi Minh City and Di An City in the province of Binh Duong, Biên Hòa City, Dong Nai Province.

With the economic situation in Ho Chi Minh City and the region growing, Hanoi Highway has become overcrowded in recent years, so Hanoi Highway will be extended up to 140 m. This project is planned to be initiated in 2009 with a project to expand Highway 51. According to the project, the construction period is 2 years initially.

References

Further reading 

"New Far-Highway Saigon - Bien-Air". World Freedom. Volume X Number 2. Saigon: United States Information Agency, 1961.

Roads in Vietnam